Felix Duchampt (born 5 September 1989) is a Romanian triathlete. He competed in the men's event at the 2020 Summer Olympics.

References

External links
 

1989 births
Living people
Romanian male triathletes
Olympic triathletes of Romania
Triathletes at the 2020 Summer Olympics
Sportspeople from Clermont-Ferrand